Mohammadabad Rural District may refer to:
 Mohammadabad Rural District (Karaj County), Alborz province
 Mohammadabad Rural District (Fars Province)
 Mohammadabad Rural District (Anbarabad County), in Kerman province
 Mohammadabad Rural District (Zarand County), in Kerman province
 Mohammadabad Rural District (Sistan and Baluchestan province)
 Mohammadabad Rural District (Yazd County), Yazd province